Stone by Stone is the seventh studio album by American rock band Floater, released on October 31, 2006.  The first pressing of the compact disc included the Behind The Scenes DVD documentary capturing moments from the band’s nearly fourteen years together, focused mainly on the recording sessions of the Acoustics and Stone by Stone albums, and some older footage. The second pressing was the CD only. When the band played the CD release shows for the album, they played the "Behind the Scenes" DVD as their opening act in select markets such as Eugene at the McDonald Theater.

Track listing 
 An Apology
 Ghost in the Making
 In America
 Weightless
 Breakdown
 Helping Hands
 Spaces In Between Us
 The Wave
 Everything Falls Our Way
 My Burden
 Proviso
 In Transition
 Tonight No One Knows
 Home in the Sky

References

[ AMG]

2006 albums
Floater (band) albums